Cozy may refer to:

Arts and entertainment
Cozy, a 1961 album by Steve Lawrence and Eydie Gormé
Cozy, a 1998 album by Tatsuro Yamashita
"Cozy", a song by the Bar-Kays from the album Too Hot to Stop
"Cozy", a song by Beyoncé from the 2022 album Renaissance
Cozy mystery, a subgenre of crime fiction
Cozy Records, an American record label

People
Cozy Cole (1909–1981), jazz drummer
Cozy Dolan (1872–1907), American baseball player
Cozy Dolan (1910s outfielder) (1889–1958), American baseball player
Cozy Morley (c. 1926 – 2013), American entertainer
Cozy Powell (1947–1998), British rock drummer

Other uses
, a U.S. Navy patrol vessel 1917–1918
Cozy III and Cozy MK IV, homebuilt light aircraft

See also

Cosy (disambiguation)
Koozie, a fabric or foam sleeve that is designed to thermally insulate a beverage container
 Cozy castle, a type of shogi castle
 Cozy Coupe, a toy car